Kevin Wallace is an American politician and businessman serving as a member of the Oklahoma House of Representatives from the 32nd district. Elected in November 2014, he assumed office on January 12, 2015.

Early life and education 
A native of Lincoln County, Oklahoma, Wallace graduated from Wellston High School. He earned a Bachelor of Business Administration from the University of Central Oklahoma in 1993.

Career 
After graduating from college, Wallace founded American Cellular Service and Dynatek Development Services. He later founded a construction company, equipment rental company, and investment firm. Wallace was elected to the Oklahoma House of Representatives in November 2014 and assumed office on January 12, 2015. He serves as chair of the House Appropriations and Budget Committee.

References 

Living people
People from Lincoln County, Oklahoma
University of Central Oklahoma alumni
Republican Party members of the Oklahoma House of Representatives
21st-century American politicians
Year of birth missing (living people)